James Click (born February 14, 1978) is an American baseball executive who is the former general manager of the Houston Astros of Major League Baseball. Click served in the Tampa Bay Rays organization for 15 years before being hired by the Astros as their general manager in January 2020.

Early life
Click is from Durham, North Carolina. He graduated from Yale University in 2000 with a Bachelor of Arts in history. After he graduated, Click wrote for Baseball Prospectus, helping to maintain their PECOTA algorithm.

Career
After being recommended by Chaim Bloom, who worked with Click at Baseball Prospectus, Click joined the Tampa Bay Rays as an intern in 2005, and the team hired him for their front office in 2006. He was promoted to vice president of baseball operations in 2017.

In January 2020, the Houston Astros hired Click as their general manager.  In 2022, the Astros won 106 games, the second-highest total in franchise history.  They advanced to the World Series and defeated the Philadelphia Phillies in six games to give Click his first career World Series championship. After his contract expired after the 2022 season, Click rejected a one-year contract offer from the Astros and the team announced that they would move on without Click.

On February 27, 2023, the Toronto Blue Jays hired James Click as Vice President, Baseball Strategy.

Personal life
Click's wife, Ace Padian, also graduated from Yale in 2000. The couple has two children.

References

Living people
Houston Astros executives
Major League Baseball general managers
Yale College alumni
Tampa Bay Rays executives
People from Durham, North Carolina
1978 births